Two Japanese destroyers have been named Hishi:

 , a  launched in 1921 and sunk in 1942
 Japanese destroyer Hishi, a  scrapped incomplete on slip in 1945

Imperial Japanese Navy ship names
Japanese Navy ship names